A Tor Phone refers to the concept of a smartphone that routes internet connections through the Tor network. The first Tor Phone was a prototype smartphone released in 2016 by The Tor Project, which gave users the ability to route internet connections through Tor for anonymity. Work on Tor Phone was launched in 2014, and a "Tor-enabled Android phone prototype" was announced in 2016. The project was led by Mike Perry, Tor Browser lead developer.

Background 
Tor Phone refers to a smartphone set to route internet connections through Tor network, for example using the Orbot application and Android VPN settings, although according to developer Mike Perry in 2016, Android's VPN APIs were not secure and could leak data at boot, which affects Orbot too. The prototype Tor Phone was based on CopperheadOS, which added additional security features. Another option is to use Torbrowser on smartphones. Follow-on project, GrapheneOS supports using Orbot (Tor) VPN, but not Tor browser, on Android-based phones. As of February 2022 or earlier, Orbot is also available for iOS phones.

Adoption 
The number of Tor users on phones is unknown. As of 2016 there were about 2 million daily Tor users, total, including all devices and methods. 

In 2018 Louis Adam of ZDNet France discussed new official support of Tor Project for Tor services on Android phones, including Tor Browser and Orbot.

John Corpuz of Toms Guide listed Tor Browser (Desktop and Android), and Onion Browser (iOS) as two of 16 "best ad blockers in 2021".

Using Tor with Orbot and Tor Browser are supported by custom Android operating systems CalyxOS and DivestOS.

Related projects 
In January 2015 David Briggs and Nick Spriggs began an unsuccessful Indiegogo campaign to make the BOSS phone, an Android-based phone with "rooted Tor encryption" to anonymize and privatize internet browsing.

In 2014 Blackphone from Silent Circle was sold as an Android-based phone with applications and services to provide more secure messaging, VPN and cloud storage. In 2014 the Boeing Black phone was advertised as a more secure Android-based phone, with dual-Sim for using public and government networks.

In 2014 a mobile version of TAILS operating system was announced.

In 2012 the Ninja phone, an HTC One V phone running Android 4.0.3, was developed to demonstrate using an independent GSM phone network at DefCon. The network was operated from The Ninja Tel van, with official looking logo, a GSM base station; a 12-foot antenna; networking and Web app servers parked in a large room at Defcon.

See also 
 Replicant (operating system)

References

External links 
 Mission Improbable Github
 Mission Impossible Github
Tor Project Mobile Support
Tor Project Mobile Documentation

Anonymity networks
Free security software
Privacy software
Tor (anonymity network)
Secure telephones
Secure communication